Guess Who is a studio album by B. B. King. It was released in 1972 by ABC Records.

Track listing
"Summer in the City" (John Sebastian, Mark Sebastian, Steve Boone) - 3:21
"Just Can't Please You" (Jimmy Robins) - 4:30writer uncredited on original release
"Any Other Way" (Clyde Otis) - 4:30
"You Don't Know Nothin' About Love" (Jerry Ragovoy) - 4:17
"Found What I Need" (Jerry Ragovoy, Jenny Dean) - 2:50
"Neighborhood Affair" (Riley King, Jules Taub) - 3:15
"It Takes a Young Girl" (Ron Rose & Dave Rouner) - 3:23
"Better Lovin' Man" (Hoyt Axton) - 4:40
"Guess Who" (Jesse Belvin, JoAnne Belvin) - 4:05
"Shouldn't Have Left Me" (Riley King) - 4:00
"Five Long Years" (Eddie Boyd) - 5:19

Personnel
B.B. King - lead guitar, vocals
Milton Hopkins - lead guitar
Cornell Dupree - rhythm guitar
Wilbert Freeman - bass guitar
Jerry Jemmott - bass guitar
Ron Levy - piano
Frank Owens - piano
V. S. "Sonny" Freeman - drums
Bernard Purdie - drums
Joseph Burton - trombone
Garnett Brown - trombone
Edward Rowe - trumpet
Ernie Royal - trumpet
Steve Madaio - trumpet
Earl Turbinton - tenor saxophone
Bobby Forte - tenor saxophone
Gene Dinwiddie - tenor saxophone
 Trevor Lawrence - tenor saxophone
Louis Hubert - baritone saxophone
Howard Johnson - baritone saxophone
David Sanborn - alto saxophone
Philip Schwartz, Tom Gamache, Tom Gundelfinger - photography, design

References

1972 albums
B.B. King albums
MCA Records albums